George Richard Mann (July 12, 1856 – March 20, 1939) was an American architect, trained at MIT, whose designs included the Arkansas State Capitol. He was the leading architect in Arkansas from 1900 until 1930, and his designs were among the finalists in competitions for the capitols of several other states.

Career
Mann was born in Syracuse, Indiana and trained at MIT.  From 1906 to 1912, Mann's office was a Beaux-Arts commercial building built to his design. It remains standing, at 115 East 5th Street, Little Rock, Arkansas.

Beginning in 1913, he partnered with Eugene Howard Stern, as the architectural firm of Mann & Stern. He became dissatisfied working with Stern and the partnership ended by 1928. In 1929, he had partnered in the firm Mann, Wanger & King.

Many of Mann's works are listed on the U.S. National Register of Historic Places.

Family
On June 28, 1910, Mann's daughter Wilhelmina married John N. Heiskell, editor of the Arkansas Gazette.  Their children included Elizabeth, Louise, John N. Jr., and Carrick.  Mann died in Little Rock, Arkansas in 1932.

Works
Albert Pike Hotel, 7th and Scott Sts. Little Rock, AR (Mann, George R.), NRHP-listed
Arkansas State Capitol, 5th and Woodlane Sts. Little Rock, AR (Mann, George R.), NRHP-listed
One or more works in Bathhouse Row, Central Ave. between Reserve and Fountain Sts., in Hot Springs National Park Hot Springs, AR (Mann, George), NRHP-listed
George R. Mann Building, 115 E. 5th St. Little Rock, AR (Mann, George R.), NRHP-listed
Gus Blass Department Store, 318–324 Main St. Little Rock, AR (Mann, George R.), NRHP-listed
One or more works in El Dorado Commercial Historic District, Courthouse Square, portions of Main, Jefferson, Washington, Jackson, Cedar and Locust Sts. El Dorado, AR (Mann, George R. & Howard Stern), NRHP-listed
Fort Smith Masonic Temple, 200 N. 11th St. Fort Smith, AR (Mann, George R.), NRHP-listed
Gazette Building, 112 W. 3rd St. Little Rock, AR (Mann, George R.), NRHP-listed
Hotel Bentley, 801 3rd St. Alexandria, LA (Mann, George R.), NRHP-listed
Hotel Pines, Main St. and W. 5th Ave. Pine Bluff, AR (Mann, George R.), NRHP-listed
Little Rock Central High School, 1500 Park Street, Little Rock, AR (Almand, Delony, Mann, Stern, Wittenburg), NRHP-listed
Pulaski County Courthouse, 405 W. Markham St. Little Rock, AR (Mann, George), NRHP-listed
Hotel Riceland, 3rd Street and South Main Street, Stuttgart, Arkansas, NRHP-listed
Rose Building, 307 Main St. Little Rock, AR (Mann, George R.), NRHP-listed
St. Vincent's Hospital, 7301 St. Charles Rock Rd. Normandy, MO (Mann, George R.), NRHP-listed
Union Life Building, 212 Center St. Little Rock, AR (Mann, George R.), NRHP-listed
Worthen Bank Building, 401 Main St. Little Rock, AR (Mann, George R.), NRHP-listed

Gallery

References

1856 births
1939 deaths
MIT School of Architecture and Planning alumni
19th-century American architects
People from Syracuse, Indiana
Artists from Little Rock, Arkansas
20th-century American architects